Lionel Zinsou (born 23 October 1953) is a French–Beninese economist and investment banker who was Prime Minister of Benin from 2015 to 2016. Since June 2017, he has been the president of Terra Nova, a centre-left French think tank.

Early life and education
Zinsou's father was born in Benin, then known as Dahomey. Zinsou himself, who was born in Paris, is a nephew of Émile Derlin Zinsou, who was President of Dahomey from 1968 to 1969.

Zinsou is a graduate of the École Normale Supérieure and the London School of Economics.

Career
Zinsou developed a close association with the French Socialist politician Laurent Fabius and worked under Fabius in the mid-1980s while the latter was in government.

Zinsou was a partner in bankers Rothschilds before joining the investment fund PAI Partners in 2008. He was also Special Adviser to the President of Benin, Yayi Boni, from 2006 to 2011.

In 2013, his Zinsou Foundation opened in Ouidah, Benin, the first museum of contemporary art in sub-Saharan Africa outside South Africa.

On 18 June 2015, President Yayi Boni appointed Zinsou as Prime Minister of Benin, along with a 27-member government, and assigned him responsibility for economic development. The post of Prime Minister does not exist in the 1990 constitution, and for most of Yayi Boni's presidency—and most of the period since the constitution came into effect—no one held the post. Zinsou's appointment came less than 10 months before the end of the President's second term, and as the latter is barred from seeking re-election, some viewed the appointment as possibly being a signal that Zinsou was his chosen successor.

Zinsou announced on 1 December 2015 that he would stand as the candidate of the Cowry Forces for an Emerging Benin in the 2016 presidential election. He said that he would focus on financing agriculture and helping informal workers obtain formal employment.

During a visit to Djougou in northwestern Benin, Zinsou's helicopter crashed at a stadium on 27 December 2015. He was not harmed.

In June 2017, Zinsou was appointed as the president of Terra Nova, a centre-left French think tank.

Other activities
 Danone, Member of the Board of Directors
 Atos, Member of the Board of Directors (2010-2014)
 Chr. Hansen, Member of the Board of Directors (2009-2011)
 Kaufman & Broad S.A., Member of the Board of Directors (2009-2015)

References

|-

1953 births
Alumni of the London School of Economics
Beninese bankers
École Normale Supérieure alumni
French bankers
French economists
French people of Beninese descent
Living people
Lycée Louis-le-Grand alumni
Politicians from Paris
Prime Ministers of Benin
Candidates for President of Benin